Roberto Manuel Sierra Giménez (born 21 May 1996) known as Rober Sierra, is a Spanish professional footballer who plays as a midfielder for Spartak Varna.

Career
Rober started his youth career with Levante. In 2015 he was promoted to Atlético Levante, but in January 2016 he was sent on loan to Mallorca B until the end of the season. In the summer of 2016 he returned in Levente, but later decided to leave the team and join Ontinyent in Segunda División B. After spending two seasons with the team he was transferred in Peralada for a season, before joining Real Oviedo II. In the summer of 2021 he moved to Formentera.

On 20 June 2022, he moved to Finland and joined Inter Turku for 1+1 year contract.

In January 2023 Rober signed with the Bulgarian First League team Spartak Varna.

References

External links
 

1996 births
Living people
Spanish footballers
Association football midfielders
Veikkausliiga players
First Professional Football League (Bulgaria) players
Ontinyent CF players
CF Peralada players
Real Oviedo Vetusta players
SD Formentera players
FC Inter Turku players
FC Spartak Varna players
Spanish expatriate footballers
Spanish expatriate sportspeople in Finland
Expatriate footballers in Finland
Spanish expatriate sportspeople in Bulgaria
Expatriate footballers in Bulgaria